USNS Able (T-AGOS-20) is a Victorious-class oceanographic survey ship in the service of the United States Navy's Military Sealift Command.

Construction
Able was laid down on 23 March 1989, at McDermott Shipyard, in Morgan City, Louisiana. Launched on 16 February 1991; sponsored by Mrs. Dorothy E. Thompson, wife of Rear Adm. William Thompson (Ret.); and placed in service with the Military Sealift Command (MSC) on 22 July 1992.

Able is an MSC-manned ocean surveillance ship that uses surveillance towed-array sensor system equipment to gather underwater acoustical data. The command operates the ship as part of its Special Mission Ships Program, using her to support the antisubmarine warfare mission of the commanders of the Atlantic and Pacific Fleets. In addition, Able carries electronic equipment to process and transmit that data via satellites to shore stations for evaluation. She is built on a small-waterplane, twin-hull design for greater stability at slow speeds in high latitudes under adverse weather conditions. She deploys primarily to the Western Pacific.

In August 2004, Able was taken out of service and laid up in the Reserve Fleet at the Naval Sea Systems Command’s Inactive Ships On-site Maintenance Office at Philadelphia, Pennsylvania. The service reactivated the ship in 2007, and transferred her to a commercial shipyard in Charleston, South Carolina, where she was converted for AN/UQQ-2 Surveillance Towed Array Sensor System (SURTASS) low frequency active-array capabilities. Able completed her conversion and reactivation the following year after steaming to the West Coast, and then deployed again to the Western Pacific.

References

Bibliography 

Online resources

External links
 Naval Vessel Register: USNS Able

 

Victorious-class ocean surveillance ships
Ships built in Morgan City, Louisiana
Small waterplane area twin hull vessels
1991 ships
Military catamarans